NGC 79 is an elliptical galaxy estimated to be about 270 million light-years away in the constellation of Andromeda. NGC 79 is its New General Catalogue designation. Its apparent magnitude is 14.9. It was discovered on 14 November 1884 by Guillaume Bigourdan.

References

External links
 

0079
Andromeda (constellation)
18841114
Elliptical galaxies